Kelly Fyffe-Marshall is a Canadian filmmaker best known for her 2020 two-part short film Black Bodies, which won the Changemaker Award at the 2020 Toronto International Film Festival, and won the Canadian Screen Award for Best Live Action Short Drama at the 9th Canadian Screen Awards in 2021.

Career 
She has also directed the short films Reason Enough (2016), Haven (2018), Black White Blue (2018) and Trap City (2020), and has worked as an assistant director and production assistant on other film and television projects. She is also the co-founder of the production company Sunflower Studios.

Fyffe-Marshall won the Toronto Film Critics Association's Jay Scott Prize at the 2020 Toronto Film Critics Association Awards.

In May 2022, Fyffe-Marshall was selected by David Cronenberg as the recipient of the "pay-it-forward" grant from his Clyde Gilmour Award package, and received $50,000 in post-production services on her feature film When Morning Comes, which premiered in the Discovery program at the 2022 Toronto International Film Festival.

Personal life 
Fyffe-Marshall was born in England, and currently resides in Brampton, Ontario.

Filmography 

 Friends with Benefits (2016) – web series
 Reason Enough (2016) – short film
 Haven (2018) – short film
 Black White Blue (2018) – short film
 Trap City (2020) – short film
 Black Bodies (2020) – short film
 When Morning Comes (2022) – feature film

References

Canadian documentary film directors
Canadian women film directors
Film directors from Ontario
People from Brampton
Black Canadian filmmakers
Black Canadian women
Year of birth missing (living people)
Living people
Directors of Genie and Canadian Screen Award winners for Best Live Action Short Drama
Canadian people of Jamaican descent
Canadian women documentary filmmakers